Todd Crandell (born December 12, 1966) is an American triathlete. He is also a Licensed Professional Clinical Counselor (LPCC-S), and a Chemical Dependency Counselor (LICDC-CS).

Early life and education
Crandell was born in Toledo, Ohio. However, he was only three years old when his mother ended her life. He was expelled from high school for cocaine which ruined a promising hockey career. After over a decade of alcohol and drug addiction, he finally stopped using when he was arrested for his third Driving Under Influence (DUI).

He completed his bachelor degree from Lourdes University in Sylvania, Ohio, and his master of counseling from Spring Arbor University in Spring Arbor, Michigan.

Career
Crandell completed his first Ironman in 1999. He underwent knee surgery two days after that race and was not expected to participate again in any race. Five months later, he finished his second Ironman. He has also competed in Ironman competitions worldwide on six continents.

Crandell has completed in 28 Ironmans, 42 half Ironmans, and two Ultramans. To date, he has completed close to 100 Ironman triathlons.

Crandell is also a Licensed Professional Clinical Counselor (LPCC-S) and a Licensed Independent Chemical Dependency Counselor (LICDC-CS). He established Racing for Recovery in 2001.

He has also written two books titled Racing for Recovery: From Addict to Ironman in 2006 and another in collaboration with Lauren Kanne called Choices and Consequences.

References

External links
Todd Crandell (Racing for Recovery)

Living people
1966 births
American male triathletes
Sportspeople from Toledo, Ohio
Spring Arbor University alumni